Jeeva is a 1986 Bollywood action thriller film starring Sanjay Dutt and Mandakini in lead roles. The film is directed by Raj N. Sippy and produced by his brother Romu N. Sippy under the production house Rupam Pictures. The film was a box office hit when released. The soundtrack of the film contains the ever-popular song "Roz Roz Aankhon Tale".

Plot
The plot revolves around Jeevan Thakur'''s (Sanjay Dutt) fight against the local cunning money lender Lala (Pran) and his ally Inspector Dushant Singh (Anupam Kher), wanting revenge for killing his parents. Orphaned in his young age, Jeevan is raised in a gang of dacoits where he takes the name Jeeva. After the death of the leader of the gang, Jeeva gets in bitter terms with another contender for the leadership, Lakhan (Shakti Kapoor) and fall in love with Nalini''.

Cast
Sanjay Dutt as Jeevan Singh / Jeeva Thakur
Mandakini as Nalini
Amjad Khan as Sardar
Shakti Kapoor as Lakhan
Sachin as Gopal Singh
Gulshan Grover
Anupam Kher as  Inspector Dushyant Singh
Pran as Lala Lalchand
Shreeram Lagoo as Thakur Singh
Vidya Sinha as  Thakurain Singh
Beena Banerjee as Beena
Satyendra Kapoor as Judge

Soundtrack
Penned by Gulzar and composed by R. D. Burman, the film features the following songs. All songs have been sung by Asha Bhosle.

References

External links
 

1986 films
1980s crime thriller films
1986 Western (genre) films
1980s crime action films
1986 action thriller films
1980s Hindi-language films
Films scored by R. D. Burman
Indian crime thriller films
Indian crime action films
Indian action thriller films
Films directed by Raj N. Sippy
Indian Western (genre) films